Joe Pyne (December 22, 1924 – March 23, 1970) was an American radio and television talk show host, who pioneered the confrontational style in which the host advocates a viewpoint and argues with guests and audience members. He was an influence on other major talk show hosts such as Bill O'Reilly, Glenn Beck, Wally George, Alan Burke, Chris Matthews, Morton Downey Jr., Bob Grant, and Michael Savage.

Biography
Joseph Pyne was born in Chester, Pennsylvania. His father, Edward Pyne, was a bricklayer; his mother, Catherine, was a housewife.

Pyne graduated from Chester High School in 1942 and immediately enlisted in the United States Marine Corps. He saw combat in the South Pacific, where he earned three battle stars. In 1943, during a Japanese bombing attack, he was wounded in the left knee; he earned a Purple Heart as a result of his injuries. In 1955, he lost the lower part of that leg due to a rare form of cancer.

Radio
Discharged from the Marines at the end of World War II, Pyne attended a local drama school to correct a speech impediment. While studying there, he decided to try radio.

He worked briefly in Lumberton, North Carolina, before he was hired at a new station, WPWA, in Brookhaven, Pennsylvania.  After an argument with the owner he was fired. Next, he got a job at radio station WILM (AM) in Wilmington, Delaware, the first of three times he would work at that station.  He moved to WVCH, a new station in Chester, which went on the air in March 1948. Seeing little chance to advance his career in Chester, Pyne left after a year and a half. He moved to Kenosha, Wisconsin, where he was hired at WLIP, owned by local station owner William Lipman (hence the call letters). After six months of hosting innocuous programs such as Meet Your Neighbor from various grocery stores, he quit during a confrontation with WLIP management in which he threw Lipman's typewriter against a wall. Pyne worked at several stations in Atlantic City, New Jersey, and began to change his style of broadcasting.

Call-in
Pyne gradually tired of being a disc jockey who made comments about politics and current events.  He developed his on-air persona as an opinionated host who knew something about everything. He returned to WILM, where he debuted as a talk show host in 1950.  He would later tell reporters that he first experimented with two-way talk during his time in Kenosha. His new show was unique. He named it It's Your Nickel, a popular idiomatic phrase when a call from a pay phone cost five cents.  The format was Pyne expressing his opinions on various topics. Listeners would call to ask questions, offer their own opinions, or raise new topics.  At first, Pyne didn't put callers on the air; he paraphrased for the audience what they had said.  Soon the callers and his interaction with them became the heart of the show.  Pyne became famous for arguing with or insulting those with whom he disagreed. One of his trademark insults was "Go gargle with razor blades."

Television
By the early 1950s, television was replacing radio as America's main medium. In 1954, Pyne moved to television with The Joe Pyne Show, broadcast by WDEL-TV in Wilmington. In 1957, he moved to Los Angeles. His initial show was unsuccessful, and he returned to Wilmington.  He hosted a TV talk show on WVUE, which was also seen in Philadelphia, and received positive reviews from critics. In the late 1950s the local black press generally praised him for inviting black newsmakers on his show to discuss issues of concern to their community. One of his regular guests was a member of the editorial staff of the area's black newspaper, the Philadelphia Tribune, usually a columnist or the newspaper's publisher.  Pyne continued this program until late 1959, when he returned to Los Angeles. This time, he was more successful.  By 1960, he was hosting a radio show on KABC (AM). The acerbic Bob Grant took over Pyne's show in 1964, and Pyne continued on KLAC.  This led to a television show on KTTV.

In 1965, during the Watts Riots in Los Angeles, Pyne was interviewing a black militant on his TV show. At one point, Pyne opened his coat to reveal that he was carrying a handgun. His guest did likewise. The station suspended Pyne for one week as a result of this stunt, which led to both the FCC considering pulling KTTV's license and syndication companies looking at distributing Pyne's show nationally. Later that year, "The Joe Pyne Show" went into wide syndication, carried by as many as 85 television stations (and 250 radio stations) at its peak. At the height of his fame, he was making $200,000 annually. At the beginning of each show he was introduced by an announcer as "the loveable, but opinionated Joe Pyne!"

In 1966, NBC gave Pyne a daytime game show called Showdown. Its distinguishing feature was that contestants who missed a question would fall to the floor in a breakaway chair. Showdown lasted only three months and was replaced by The Hollywood Squares, which aired for 14 years until 1980.

Confrontations and controversy
Pyne spoke out against racial discrimination and supported the Vietnam War. He ridiculed hippies (a favorite target), homosexuals, and feminists. Though generally a conservative, Pyne spoke in favor of labor unions. His tendency toward insult and vitriol offended most critics, who called him "outrageous," "belligerent," and "self-righteous." Groups such as the Anti-Defamation League accused him of catering to bigots.

There are many documented cases of Pyne getting into altercations with people on his show. He preferred controversial guests such as Anton Szandor Lavey, Sam Sloan and invited members of the Ku Klux Klan, the American Nazi Party, and followers of murderer Charles Manson. Pyne argued this was educational, since it exposed these violent groups to the public eye. The Joe Pyne Show was not only verbally confrontational: at times the conflict became physical, with chairs being thrown at Pyne by the interviewee.  If the "discussion" got too heated, the guest would often walk off, or Pyne would himself throw the guest off the show, with the parting comment, "take a hike."   Still, Pyne once described himself as an "overly compensating introvert."

A notorious story of a confrontation on Pyne's television show involves guest Paul Krassner, the editor of The Realist. Pyne made insulting remarks about Krassner's acne scars. Without missing a beat, Krassner asked Pyne if his wooden leg caused any difficulty in having sex with his wife. Pyne was bewildered, so he sought comments from his audience, which, at this point in his career, was made up of whomever KTTV could bring in from Hollywood Boulevard. The audience happened to include musician and activist Phil Ochs, whom Krassner had brought along to the studio. Ochs very calmly remarked, "What Paul Krassner has just done is in the finest tradition of American journalism."  No video of this incident survives; Krassner insists that it occurred, but was edited out of the broadcast.

A similar exchange reportedly occurred with Frank Zappa: Pyne is reported to have said "I guess your long hair makes you a woman", to which Zappa responded "So I guess your wooden leg makes you a table."

Maulana Karenga, a black author, political activist, and creator of Kwanzaa, was a frequent guest on the show, as was Robert Dornan ("B-1 Bob"), who became a congressman from Orange County.

Gay activists Harry Hay and John Burnside—who were a couple from 1962 until Hay's death in 2002—appeared on Pyne's show in 1967.

Movies
In the 1966 film Unkissed Bride (aka Mother Goose A Go-Go) Pyne appears as himself hosting a portion of his radio show discussing psychiatrists, and then later in a car with his wife out for dinner, and including a chauffeur who answers a car phone call from someone calling him as if he's still hosting the phone-in radio show.

The 1969 film Midnight Cowboy includes a brief clip of a fictional TV talk show similar to Pyne's, with screenwriter Waldo Salt appearing in a cameo as the host.

Death
Pyne developed lung cancer from his smoking habit, and died in Los Angeles on March 23, 1970, at age 45 and was cremated.

References

External links

TV Party: Joe Pyne
Joe Pyne video clips
Joe Pyne on Talkers Magazine On Line
Time magazine on Joe Pyne

The Joe Pyne Show at IMDB

1924 births
1970 deaths
20th-century American musicians
American amputees
American conservative talk radio hosts
American game show hosts
American radio DJs
American talk radio hosts
American television talk show hosts
United States Marine Corps personnel of World War II
Chester High School alumni
Deaths from lung cancer in California
People from Chester, Pennsylvania
Radio personalities from Los Angeles
Radio personalities from Philadelphia
United States Marines